Virgin Box is a three disc Virgin compilation album, and was released in November 2006.

Track listing

Disc 1

Tracks taken from Virgin (2002):

Dzieci ziemi - 3:40
9 życzeń - 2:42
To Ty - 3:44
Nie Złość Dody - 3:37
Nie tak - do mnie mówi się! - 3:29
Nie odpowiadaj - 3:34
Na niby - 2:26
Masz jeszcze czas - 2:54
Czekam - 1:47
Punkowy - 1:37
Mam Tylko Ciebie - 3:18
Sława - a za co to? - 2:54
Material Girl - 2:26
Będę dziś szalona - 3:01
Sagan Ohm Warr - 2:53
To Ty - 4:02

Disc 2

Tracks taken from Bimbo (2004):

"Szafa - 3:55
"Chłopczyku Mój" - 4:06
"Dżaga" - 4:05
"Nie Zawiedź Mnie" - 3:12
"Nie Oceniać Jej" - 4:36
"Et Anima" - 4:34
"Ulica" - 3:56
"Piekarnia" - 3:15
"Okno Boże" - 3:05
"Teraz To Wiem" - 3:25
"Bar" - 3:31
"Kolejny Raz" - 3:25
"Moj "M"" - 2:59

Disc 3

Tracks taken from Ficca (2005):

 "Szansa"
 "Inni Przyjaciele"
 "Dezyda"
 "Opowiem Ci"
 "Superstar"
 "Znak Pokoju"
 "Mam wszystko w..."
 "2 Bajki"
 "In Love"
 "Piosenka na imprezę"
 "Dla R. (Nieważne dziś jest)"
 "Mam Tylko Ciebie" (wersja live)

2006 compilation albums
Virgin (band) compilation albums